George the Elder may refer to:
George Bickham the Elder (1684–1758), English writing master and engraver
George Dance the Elder (1695–1768), English architect
George Adams (scientist, died 1773) (c. 1709–1773), English instrument maker and science writer
George Colman the Elder (1732–1794), English dramatist and essayist
George Cuitt the Elder (1743–1818), English painter
George Osbaldeston the elder (c. 1753–1793), English landowner and politician
John George Bourinot (elder) (1814–1884), French Canadian merchant and politician
George H. W. Bush (1924–2018), also known as George Bush the Elder, American politician